The Théâtre Édouard VII, also called théâtre Édouard VII – Sacha Guitry, is located in Paris between the Madeleine and the Opéra Garnier in the 9th arrondissement. The square, in which there is a statue of King Edward the Seventh, was opened in 1911. The theatre, which was originally a cinema, was named in the honour of King Edward VII, as he was nicknamed the "most Parisian of all Kings", appreciative of French culture. In the early to mid 1900s,under the direction of Sacha Guitry, the theatre became a symbol of anglo-franco friendship, and where French people could discover and enjoy Anglo Saxon works. French actor and director Bernard Murat is the current director of the theatre. Modern "boulevard comedies" and vaudevilles are often performed there, and subtitled in English by the company Theatre in Paris. Important figures in the arts, cinema and theatre have performed there, including Orson Welles, Eartha Kitt, and more. Pablo Picasso created props for a play at the Théâtre Edouard VII in 1944.

History

1916: Alphonse Franck 
 1916: All right revue in 2 acts and 14 tableaux by Rip
 1917: La Folle Nuit ou Le Dérivatif musical by André Mouëzy-Éon and Félix Gandéra, music Marcel Pollet 
 1917: Son Petit Frère, two acts operetta by André Barde, music Charles Cuvillier
 1917: Le Feu du voisin by Francis de Croisset
 1917: La Jeune Fille au bain by Louis Verneuil
 1917: La Petite Bonne d'Abraham, three acts biblical tale by André Mouëzy-Éon and Félix Gandéra, music by Marcel Pollet
 1917: Il le faut ! by René Berton, Manon en voyage by Jules Massenet and Claude Terrasse, Rien qu'un by André Pascales (one act play and comic opera)
 1919: Phi-Phi by Albert Willemetz and Henri Christiné
 1919: Le Loup dans la bergerie 3 acts tale by Georges Manoir and Armand Verhyle after Balzac
 1919: L'Enfantement du mort by Marcel L'Herbier
 1920: L'École des satyres
 1920: L'Erreur d'une nuit d'été by Philippe Maquet
 1920: Je t'aime by Sacha Guitry
 1921: Le Comédien by Sacha Guitry
 1921: Le cœur dispose by Francis de Croisset
 1921: Le Grand Duc by Sacha Guitry
 1921: Faisons un rêve by Sacha Guitry 
 1921: Jacqueline by Sacha Guitry, after Henri Duvernois 
 1922: Jean de La Fontaine by Sacha Guitry
 1922: Une petite main qui se place by Sacha Guitry
 1922: Seul by Henri Duvernois
 1922: Le Misanthrope by Molière
 1923: Un sujet de roman by Sacha Guitry
 1923: L'Amour masqué comédie musicale by Sacha Guitry and André Messager
 1923: Le Lion et la poule by Sacha Guitry
 1924: La Danseuse éperdue by René Fauchois
 1924: L'Âge de raison by Paul Vialar
 1924: L'École des femmes by Molière, directed by Lucien Guitry
 1924: Une étoile nouvelle by Sacha Guitry 
 1925: On ne joue pas pour s'amuser by Sacha Guitry
 1925: Mozart by Sacha Guitry, music Reynaldo Hahn
 1926: A vol d'oiseau by Sacha Guitry and Albert Willemetz
 1926: Souris d'hôtel by Paul Armont and Marcel Gerbidon
 1926: The Co-Optimiste by Melville Gideon
 1927: Knock Out by Jacques Natanson and Jacques Théry
 1927: Désiré by Sacha Guitry
 1927: Jean de La Fontaine by Sacha Guitry
 1927: La Vagabonde by Colette
 1928: Mariette ou Comment on écrit l'histoire by Sacha Guitry
 1929: L'Amoureuse Aventure by Paul Armont and Marcel Gerbidon, directed by Jacques Baumer

1929: Louis Verneuil 
In 1929, Alphonse Franck is succeeded by Louis Verneuil for six months.
 1929: Mademoiselle ma mère by Louis Verneuil 
 1929: Azaïs by Louis Verneuil
 1929: Le Grand Voyage by Robert Cedric Sherriff
 1929: Tu m'épouseras ! by Louis Verneuil
 1930: Miss France by Georges Berr and Louis Verneuil

1930: Maurice Lehmann 
In 1930, Maurice Lehmann becomes new director until 1931 when the place runs again as a movie theatre.
 1930: Le Rendez-vous by Marcel Achard
 1930: L'Assemblée des femmes by Maurice Donnay after Aristophanes

1931: Victor Francen 
 1931: Les Trois Chambres by Henri-René Lenormand 
 1931: Déodat by Henry Kistemaeckers

1931: Alphonse Franck 
At the end of the year 1931, Twentieth Century Fox takes over the movie theatre.
 1938: L'Écurie Watson by Terence Rattigan, adaptation Pierre Fresnay and Maurice Sachs

1941: Robert Gallois 
In 1940, theatre returns.
 1940: L'Insoumise by Pierre Frondaie
 1941: Marché noir by Steve Passeur, directed by Camille Corney 
 1941: Arsène Lupin by Francis de Croisset and Maurice Leblanc 
 1942: Les J3 ou la nouvelle école by Roger-Ferdinand, directed by Jacques Baumer
 1942: Jeunesse by Paul Nivoix
 1942: Une belle histoire by Guy Rotter
 1942: L'Honnête Florentine by Henry Chabrol

1943: Jean-Michel Renaitour and Jacqueline Heusch 
 1943: L'Affranchi by Charles Méré
 1943: La Tragédie d'Alexandre by Paul Demasy

1944: Pierre Béteille 
 1944: Le Roi Christine by Marcelle Maurette
 1944: Andromaque by Jean Racine, directed by Jean Cocteau 
 1944: A Midsummer Night's Dream by William Shakespeare, adaptation Georges Neveux
 1944: Les Plus Beaux Yeux du monde by Jean Sarment
 1945: Sérénade à trois by Noël Coward
 1945: Tristan et Iseult by Lucien Fabre, directed by Alfred Pasquali
 1945: Les Dames de Niskala by Hella Wuolijoki 
 1946: Les Derniers Seigneurs by Roger Ferdinand, directed by Jacques Baumer
 1946: Les Pères ennemis by Charles Vildrac, directed by Georges Vitaly
 1946: The Dybbuk by Shalom Anski, directed by André Marcovici 
 Bichon by Jean de Létraz, with Pierre Bertin
 Le Gâteau des Rois by Marcelle Capron 
 1947: Of Mice and Men adaptation by Marcel Duhamel after John Steinbeck, directed by Paul Œttly
 1947: L'amour vient en jouant by Jean Bernard-Luc, directed by Pierre-Louis
 1947: Des hommes viendront, a play by Roger Saltel 
 1948: The Lame Devil by Sacha Guitry, directed by the author 
 1948: La Savetière prodigieuse after Federico García Lorca, directed by Pierre Bertin
 1948: Joyeux Chagrins after Noël Coward, adaptation André Roussin and Pierre Gay, directed by Louis Ducreux
 1948: Shéhérazade by Jules Supervielle, directed by Jean Vilar, Festival d'Avignon
 1948: Les Enfants d'Édouard by Frederic Jackson and Roland Bottomley, adaptation Marc-Gilbert Sauvajon, directed by Jean Wall
 La Huitième Femme de Barbe-Bleue by Charlton Andrews, adaptation Alfred Savoir
 1949: Le Silence de la mer after Vercors, directed by Jean Mercure
 1949: A Streetcar Named Desire by Tennessee Williams, adaptation Jean Cocteau, directed by Raymond Rouleau
 1950: Cabrioles by Roger Ferdinand
 1950: Time Runs by Orson Welles after Faust by Dante, Milton, Christopher Marlowe, directed by the author
 1950: The Blessed and the damned and The Unthinking Lobster by Orson Welles, directed by the author 
 1950: Poof by Armand Salacrou, directed by Yves Robert
 1950: Pourquoi pas moi by Armand Salacrou, directed by Jacques Dumesnil
 1950: Le Château du carrefour by Odette Joyeux
 1951: L'Ile heureuse by Jean-Pierre Aumont, directed by Pierre Dux 
 1951: Ce monde n'est pas fait pour les anges by Pascal Bastia 
 1951: Tapage nocturne by Marc-Gilbert Sauvajon, directed by Jean Wall

1951: Elizabeth Hijar 
 1951: The Innocents by William Archibald, directed by Roland Piétri
 1951: Ombre chère by Jacques Deval, directed by the author
 1953: Demeure chaste et pure by George Axelrod, adaptation Jacques Deval, directed by Jacques Deval
 1954: Souviens-toi mon amour by André Birabeau, directed by Pierre Dux 
 1955: Il y a longtemps que je t'aime by Jacques Deval, directed by Jean Le Poulain
 1955: Isabelle et le pélican by Marcel Franck, mise en scène Marc Camoletti
 1955: Témoin à charge by Agatha Christie, directed by Pierre Valde
 1955: Le Système deux by Georges Neveux, directed by René Clermont
 1955: Fric-Frac by Édouard Bourdet, 
 1955: La Cuisine des anges by Albert Husson, directed by Christian-Gérard
 1955: Zamore by Georges Neveux, directed by Henri Soubeyran
 1956: La Nuit du 4 août by Albert Husson, directed by Christian-Gérard
 1956: Le mari ne compte pas by Roger-Ferdinand, directed by Jacques Morel
 1957: Une femme trop honnête by Armand Salacrou, directed by Georges Vitaly
 1957: Le monsieur qui a perdu ses clefs by Michel Perrin, directed by Raymond Gérôme

1958: Raymond Rouleau 
 1958: Oncle Otto by Jacques Mauclair, directed by the author
 1958: Nous entrerons dans la carrière by René Catroux, directed by Raymond Rouleau
 1958: Virage dangereux by John Boynton Priestley, directed by Raymond Rouleau

1958: Claude Génia 
Starting in 1958, Claude Génia becomes responsible for the theatre and introduces new notable plays such as L'Année du bac, Jours heureux, Bonheur, impair et passe… and a new generation of actors like Sami Frey, Francis Nani, Jacques Perrin, Roger Dumas, Juliette Gréco, Daniel Gélin, Michel de Ré, Jean-Louis Trintignant, Marthe Mercadier, Jean Le Poulain...
 1958: Lady Godiva by Jean Canolle, directed by Michel de Ré 
 1958: L'Enfant du dimanche by Pierre Brasseur, directed by Pierre Valde
 1958: L'Année du bac by José-André Lacour, directed by Yves Robert
 1960: Carlota by Miguel Mihura, adaptation Emmanuel Robles, directed by Jacques Mauclair
 1960: De doux dingues by Michel André after Joseph Carole, directed by Jean Le Poulain
 1961: Huit Femmes by Robert Thomas, a remake of which was later realised by the film director François Ozon, Huit Femmes, directed by Jean Le Poulain
 1962: Bichon by Jean de Létraz, directed by Jean Meyer 
 1963: Sémiramis by Marc Camoletti, directed by Michel de Ré
 1963: L'Âge idiot by Jean Meyer, directed by Maurice Guillaud
 1964: Bonheur, impair et passe by Françoise Sagan, directed by the author with Claude Régy
 1964: Tim by Pol Quentin after Paul Osborn, directed by Jacques-Henri Duval
 1964: Diary of a Madman by Nikolai Gogol, directed by François Perrot and Roger Coggio 
 1964: Le Deuxième Coup de feu by Robert Thomas, directed by Pierre Dux
 1965: Pourquoi pas Vamos by Georges Conchon, directed by Jean Mercure 
 1965: Les Bargasses by Marc'O, directed by the author
 1965: La Nuit de Lysistrata by Aristophanes, directed by Gérard Vergez
 1965: Les Filles by Jean Marsan, directed by Jean Le Poulain
 1965: Chat en poche by Georges Feydeau, directed by Jean-Laurent Cochet
 1966: Faust by Christopher Marlowe, directed by Jean-Louis Andrieux

1966: Wilfrid Dodd 
In 1967, Francis Veber presents his first play L'Enlèvement. Simone Valère and Jean Desailly play Double Jeu by Robert Thomas before Robert Lamoureux and Françoise Rosay introduce La Soupière, a comedy. Claude Dauphin is Shylock in The Merchant of Venice adaptation Thierry Maulnier before Elvire Popesco again plays La Mamma by André Roussin.

 1966: Ange pur by Gaby Bruyère, directed by Francis Joffo
 1966: Seule dans le noir by Frédéric Knott, adaptation Raymond Castans, directed by Raymond Rouleau
 1966: La Polka des lapins by Tristan Bernard, directed by Nicole Anouilh
 1967: Xavier by Jacques Deval, directed by Jacques-Henri Duval
 1967: Frédéric by Robert Lamoureux, directed by Pierre Mondy
 1968: Des enfants de cœur by François Campaux, directed by Christian-Gérard
 1968: L'Amour propre by Marc Camoletti, directed by the author
 1968: L'Enlèvement by Francis Veber, directed by Jacques Fabbri
 1969: Voyage à trois by Jean de Létraz, directed by Robert Manuel
 1969: L'Assassinat de Sister George by Franck Marcus, adaptation Jean Cau, directed by Andréas Voutsinas, 
 1969: Les Garçons de la bande by Mart Crowley, directed by Jean-Laurent Cochet

1970: Robert Thomas 
 1970: The Merchant of Venice by William Shakespeare, directed by Marcelle Tassencourt
 1970: Double Jeu by Robert Thomas, directed by Jacques Charon
 1971: Le Train de l'aube by Tennessee Williams, directed by Jean-Pierre Laruy
 1971: La Soupière by Robert Lamoureux, directed by Francis Joffo and Robert Lamoureux
 1971: Piège pour un homme seul by Robert Thomas, directed by Jacques Charon 
 1972: En avant... toute ! by Michel André, directed by Michel Roux
 1974: La Mamma by André Roussin, directed by the author
 1975: Viens chez moi, j'habite chez une copine by Luis Rego and Didier Kaminka, directed by Jean-Luc Moreau

1974: 
 Hélène ou la Joie de vivre by André Roussin and Madeleine Gray, directed by René Clermont
 Pluie by John Colton and Clemence Randolph after Somerset Maugham, adaptation E.R. Blanchet and Horace de Carbuccia, directed by René Clermont
 1975: 
 Le Système Ribadier by Georges Feydeau, directed by Robert Manuel
 Dix minutes d'alibi by Anthony Armstrong, adaptation Maurice Renault, directed by Jacques Ardouin 
 La Nuit du 16 janvier by Ayn Rand, adaptation Marcel Dubois, directed by André Villiers
 La Complice by Jacques Rémy after a novel by Louis C. Thomas, directed by Jacques Ardouin 
 Trésor party by Bernard Régnier after Pelham Grenville Wodehouse, directed by Jacques Ardouin
 Chat en poche by Georges Feydeau, directed by Jean-Laurent Cochet
 Demandez Vicky by Marc-Gilbert Sauvajon after Alan Melville and Fred Schiller, directed by Jacques-Henri Duval
 Le Pape kidnappé by João Bethencourt, adaptation André Roussin, directed by René Clermont
 La Facture by Françoise Dorin, directed by Jacques Charon
 Ah ! La Police de papa ! by Raymond Castans, directed by Jacques Charon
 Quelqu'un derrière la porte by Jacques Robert, directed by André Villiers
 Le noir te va si bien by Jean Marsan after Saul O'Hara, directed by Jean Le Poulain
 Le Nu au tambour by Noël Coward, adaptation Albert Husson, directed by Jacques-Henri Duval and Jean Degrave
 Les Hannetons by Eugène Brieux, directed by René Clermont
 Un homme d'action by William Dinner and William Morum, adaptation Pol Quentin, directed by Grégoire Aslan
 Il était une gare by Jacques Deval, directed by Jacques Mauclair
 Le Sourire de la Joconde by Aldous Huxley, adaptation Georges Neveux, directed by Raymond Gérôme 
 The Mandrake by Roland Jouve after Machiavelli, directed by Jacques Ardouin
 Inspecteur Grey by André Faltianni and Alfred Gragnon, directed by Robert Manuel
 Mon cœur balance by Michel Duran, directed by Claude Nicot
 Monsieur Silence by Jean Guitton, directed by Christian Alers
 Les Derniers Outrages by Robert Beauvais, directed by Michel Roux
 Lady Godiva by Jean Canolle, directed by Michel de Ré
 On croit rêver by Jacques François, directed by the author
 Le Moulin de la galette by Marcel Achard, directed by Max Fournel
 La Rabouilleuse by Émile Fabre after Honoré de Balzac, directed by Robert Manuel
 1976: 
 Le Pirate by Raymond Castans, directed by Jacques Sereys
 Sacrés Fantômes by Eduardo De Filippo, directed by Jean Michaud
 Seul le poisson rouge est au courant by Jean Barbier and Dominique Nohain, directed by Dominique Nohain
 La Sainte Famille by André Roussin, directed by Georges Vitaly
 Am-Stram-Gram by André Roussin, directed by Claude Nicot
 La Bagatelle by Marcel Achard, directed by Jean Meyer
 Fanny et ses gens by Jerome K. Jerome, adaptation André Méry and Pierre Scize, directed by Raymond Gérôme
 Le Guilledou by Michael Clayton Hutton, adaptation Constance Coline, directed by Robert Manuel
 Week-end by Noël Coward, adaptation André Méry and Antoine Bibesco, directed by Jacques Ardouin
 Le monsieur qui attend by Emlyn Williams, adaptation André Roussin, directed by Georges Vitaly
 La Charrette anglaise by Georges Berr and Louis Verneuil, directed by Jean-Laurent Cochet
 Xavier ou l'héritier des Lancestre by Jacques Deval, directed by Robert Manuel
 Le Cœur sous le paillasson by Harold Brooke and Kay Bannerman, adaptation Alexandre Breffort, directed by Michel Vocoret
 La Femme de paille by Catherine Arley, directed by Raymond Gérôme
 L'Héritière by Ruth Goetz and Augustus Goetz, adaptation Louis Ducreux, directed by René Clermont
 Un mois à la campagne by Ivan Turgenev, adaptation Albert Husson, directed by Jean Meyer
 La Frousse by Julien Vartet, directed by René Clermont
 Le Coin tranquille by Michel André, directed by Michel Vocoret
 Une femme presque fidèle by Jacques Bernard, directed by Jacques Mauclair
 Le monsieur qui a perdu ses clés by Michel Perrin, directed by Robert Manuel
 Attends-moi pour commencer by Joyce Rayburn, adaptation Jean Marsan, directed by Michel Roux

1976: Simone Valère and Jean Desailly 
 1976: Dis-moi, Blaise after Blaise Cendrars, directed by Michel Bertay
 1976: Amphitryon 38 by Jean Giraudoux, directed by Jean-Laurent Cochet
 1977: An Enemy of the People by Henrik Ibsen, directed by Étienne Bierry

1978: Pierre Bergé 
Under the direction of Pierre Bergé the repertory expands with the creation of Nous ne connaissons pas la même personne by François-Marie Banier and Navire Night by Marguerite Duras. Robert Hirsch is invited in 1979 after a long career at the Comédie-Française and successfully plays in Deburau.

 1978: Nous ne connaissons pas la même personne by François-Marie Banier, directed by Pierre Boutron
 1979: Navire Night by Marguerite Duras, directed by Claude Régy
 1979: Le Mort by Georges Bataille, directed by Claude Régy
 1979: Le Piège by Ira Levin, directed by Riggs O'Hara
 1979: Chat en poche by Georges Feydeau, directed by Jean-Laurent Cochet, with Thierry Le Luron
 1980: Deburau by Sacha Guitry, directed by Jacques Rosny

1981: Jacqueline Cormier 
First apparition of Philippe Caubère on a Parisian stage in January 1982 in his Danse du Diable. That same year Edwige Feuillère chose the Théâtre Édouard VII to return on the stage in La Dernière Nuit de l'été.

Jean Poiret and Maria Pacôme play Joyeuses Pâques. In 1983, Strindberg has his only and great popular success in Paris with Miss Julie played by Niels Arestrup and Fanny Ardant after Isabelle Adjani.

The year before that of his anniversary, Sacha Guitry returns home, thanks to Jean-Claude Brialy and Marie-José Nat, playing as a couple in Désiré.

With Chapitre II de Noël Simon, adapted by Pierre Barillet and Jean-Pierre Gredy and directed by Pierre Mondy, both Mireille Darc and Jean Piat returns on stage. La Répétition ou l'Amour puni by Jean Anouilh is played by Pierre Arditi, Emmanuelle Béart, Anny Duperey, Bernard Giraudeau and Béatrice Agenin, directed by Bernard Murat.

Paris discovers the English adaptation of the French classic Dangerous Liaisons with Bernard Giraudeau and Caroline Cellier. The season ends in May 1989 with Un mois à la campagne, dramatic comedy by Turgenev, with Isabelle Huppert, in a mise-en-scène by Bernard Murat.

 1982: La Danse du diable by Philippe Caubère
 1982: La Dernière Nuit de l'été d'Alexei Arbuzov, directed by Yves Bureau
 1983: Miss Julie by August Strindberg, adaptation Boris Vian, directed by Andréas Voutsinas
 1983: Joyeuses Pâques by Jean Poiret, directed by Pierre Mondy
 1984: Désiré by Sacha Guitry, directed by Jean-Claude Brialy
 1984: Treize à table by Marc-Gilbert Sauvajon, directed by René Clermont 
 1985: Chapitre II by Neil Simon, adaptation Pierre Barillet and Jean-Pierre Gredy, directed by Pierre Mondy 
 1986: La Répétition ou l'Amour puni by Jean Anouilh, directed by Bernard Murat
 1986: Les Clients by Jean Poiret, directed by Bernard Murat
 1987: Époque épique by Bernard Haller and Jean-Claude Carrière, with Bernard Haller
 1988: Les Liaisons dangereuses by Christopher Hampton after Choderlos de Laclos, directed by Gérard Vergez
 1988: Glengarry Glen Ross by David Mamet, directed by Marcel Maréchal

1989: Julien Vartet 
The season starts in October 1989 with a new director, Julien Vartet and many comédies en vaudevilles which he authored: Point de feu sans fumée, Décibel, La Frousse, Archibald. These comedies alternate with an eclectic program: revival of Maxibules, a forgotten play by Marcel Aymé.

At the end of October 1994, the season starts with two plays by Georges Feydeau, On purge Bébé and Feu la Mère de Madame with Muriel Robin, Pierre Richard and Darry Cowl, in a mise-en-scene by Bernard Murat.

Julien Vartet undertakes important works of renovation which lead to the air conditioning of the venue.

 1989: Un mois à la campagne by Ivan Turgenev, directed by Bernard Murat
 1989: Point de feu sans fumée by Julien Vartet, directed by Jean-Paul Tribout
 1990: Les Maxibules by Marcel Aymé, directed by Gérard Savoisien
 1990: Le Plaisir de rompre and Le Pain de ménage by Jules Renard are interpreted by Anny Duperey, Bernard Giraudeau and Bernard Murat in a mise-en-scène by the latter
 1991: Décibel by Julien Vartet, directed by Gérard Savoisien
 1991: Jeanne et les juges by Thierry Maulnier, directed by Marcelle Tassencourt 
 1991: Même heure l'année prochaine by Bernard Slade, directed by Roger Vadim
 1992: Les Enfants d'Édouard by Marc-Gilbert Sauvajon, directed by Jean-Luc Moreau
 1993: La Frousse by Julien Vartet, directed by Raymond Acquaviva
 1993: Toâ by Sacha Guitry, directed by Stéphane Hillel 
 1993: Durant avec un T by Julien Vartet, directed by Daniel Colas
 1994: La Nuit à Barbizon by Julien Vartet, directed by Gérard Savoisien
 1994: On purge bébé by Feu la mère de Madame by Georges Feydeau, directed by Bernard Murat 
 1994: Décibel by Julien Vartet, directed by Gérard Savoisien
 1995: Archibald by Julien Vartet, directed by Daniel Colas
 1998: Les Cinémas de la rue d'Antibes by Julien Vartet, directed by the author 
 1999: Archibald dby Julien Vartet, directed by Jacqueline Bœuf

2001: Bernard Murat and Jean-Louis Livi 
After it was closed one year, the theatre reopened in September 2001 under the codirection by Bernard Murat and Jean-Louis Livi.

 2001: La Jalousie by Sacha Guitry, directed by Bernard Murat, with Michel Piccoli, Anne Brochet, Stéphane Freiss and Annick Alane
 2002: Sarah by John Murrell, adapted by Éric-Emmanuel Schmitt, directed by Bernard Murat, with Robert Hirsch and Fanny Ardant then Anny Duperey
 2003: Petits crimes conjugaux by Éric-Emmanuel Schmitt, directed by Bernard Murat, with Bernard Giraudeau and for the first time on stage, Charlotte Rampling
 2003: L'Invité, first play by David Pharao, directed by Jean-Luc Moreau, Patrick Chesnais, Evelyne Buyle, and Philippe Khorsand
 2004: Lunes de miel, comedy by Noël Coward, adaptation Éric-Emmanuel Schmitt, directed by Bernard Murat will be played some 250 times by the couple Pierre Arditi and Evelyne Bouix
 2005: Amitiés sincères by François Prévôt-Leygonie and Stéphan Archinard, directed by Bernard Murat, with Bernard Murat and Michel Leeb
 2005: Mémoires d'un tricheur by Sacha Guitry, adapted, directed and played by Francis Huster
 2006: Deux sur la balançoire by William Gibson, adaptation Jean-Loup Dabadie, directed by Bernard Murat, with Alexandra Lamy and Jean Dujardin
 2006: Le Vieux Juif blond, first play by Amanda Sthers, originally interpreted par Mélanie Thierry and directed by Jacques Weber, then by Fanny Valette under the direction of Bernard Murat
 2006: Les Grandes Occasions by Bernard Slade, directed by Bernard Murat, with Clémentine Célarié dans Jean Reno 
 2007: L'Idée fixe by Paul Valéry, interpreted for the second time, some 20 years later, by Pierre Arditi and Bernard Murat, directed by Bernard Murat

2007: Bernard Murat 
In September 2007, the théâtre Édouard VII celebrates the year of Sacha Guitry (1885–1957) with two shows:
 2007: Mon père avait raison by Sacha Guitry, directed by Bernard Murat, with Claude and Alexandre Brasseur playing together for the first time, like Lucien and Sacha Guitry before them.
 2007: Un type dans le genre de Napoléon, four unpublished one act plays by Sacha Guitry, directed by Bernard Murat, with Martin Lamotte, Florence Pernel, and Chloé Lambert

The following plays were all directed by Bernard Murat:
 2008: Tailleur pour dames by Georges Feydeau
 2008: Faisons un rêve by Sacha Guitry
 2009: L'Éloignement by Loleh Bellon
 2009: Sentiments provisoires by Gérald Aubert
 2010: Audition by Jean-Claude Carrière
 2010: Le Prénom by Matthieu Delaporte and Alexandre de la Patellière
 2011: Le Paradis sur terre by Tennessee Williams
 2011: Quadrille by Sacha Guitry
 2012: Le Dindon by Georges Feydeau
 2012: Comme s'il en pleuvait by Sébastien Thiéry
 2014: La Porte à côté by Fabrice Roger-Lacan with Emmanuelle Devos and Édouard Baer
 2015: Le Mensonge by Florian Zeller with Pierre Arditi, Évelyne Bouix, Josiane Stoléru and Jean-Michel Dupuis

References

External links 
 Official site of the théâtre Édouard VII

Edouard 07
Edouard 07
Theatre company production histories